Arina Charopa (born October 18, 1995) is a Belarusian retired individual rhythmic gymnast. She is the 2012 Grand Prix Final All-around silver medalist and 2010 Youth Olympic silver medalist.

Career

Junior 
Charopa as a junior won the silver medal at the 2010 Youth Olympic Games in Singapore ahead of German gymnast Jana Berezko-Marggrander, she also won silver in ribbon and rope at the 2010 European Junior Championships.

Senior 
Charopa debuted as a senior in 2011, the absence of most veteran rhythmic gymnasts competing in Grand Prix after the 2012 Summer Olympics she was able to compete at the 2012 Grand Prix Final in Brno where she won silver medal in all-around and hoop  behind the reigning Olympic silver medalist Daria Dmitrieva. Charopa started the 2013 season competing at Valentine World Cup, she finished 5th in all-around at the 2013 Moscow Grand Prix and in 2013 Baltic Hoop. She competed at the 2013 Lisboa World Cup and the 2013 Bucharest World Cup. Charopa competed in her first senior Europeans at the 2013 European Championships together with her teammates ( Katsiaryna Halkina and Melitina Staniouta) where Team Belarus won the bronze medal. She then competed at the 2013 World Games in Cali, Colombia.

In 2014 Season, Charopa began competing at the 2014 LA Lights and won the all-around bronze medal behind Ganna Rizatdinova. She then competed at the 2014 Thiais Grand Prix and finished 9th in all-around. Charopa then competed at the 2014 Debrecen World Cup finishing 7th in the all-around and won bronze in ribbon. Charopa finished 7th in all-around at the 2014 Holon Grand Prix. In her second World Cup event, Charopa finished 7th in all-around at the 2014 Lisboa World Cup, she qualified to all 4 event finals and won silver in ribbon. On May 3–5, Charopa then competed at the 2014 Kalamata Cup and finished 4th in all-around behind teammate Halkina. Charopa then competed at the 2014 Corbeil-Essonnes World Cup and finished 11th in all-around. On September 5–7, Charopa competed in Senor International tournament in Kazan, Russia where she won the all-around silver behind Russia's Diana Ibragimova. On September 22–28, Charopa (along with teammates Melitina Staniouta and Katsiaryna Halkina) represented Belarus at the 2014 World Championships where they took the Team silver with a total of 136.073 points.

In 2015 Season, Charopa suffered injury at the start of the season. On May 22–24, Charopa competed at the 2015 Tashkent World Cup finishing 11th in the all-around. In August, Charopa competed at the MTK Budapest Cup finishing 4th in the all-around behind Russian Arina Averina. In apparatus finals, Charopa won bronze in clubs and ribbon. On September 9–13, Charopa (together with teammates Melitina Staniouta, Katsiaryna Halkina and Hanna Bazhko) competed at the 2015 World Championships in Stuttgart, with Team Belarus winning the silver. On October 2–4, Charopa together with teammates Melitina Staniouta and junior Yulia Isachanka represented Team Dinamo Minsk at the 2015 Aeon Cup in Tokyo Japan, Charopa finished 13th in the individual all-around finals and with team Belarus finishing 3rd in the overall standings.

Charopa completed her career at the end of the 2016 Season.

Routine music information

References

External links
 

1995 births
Living people
Belarusian rhythmic gymnasts
Gymnasts at the 2010 Summer Youth Olympics
Medalists at the Rhythmic Gymnastics European Championships
Medalists at the Rhythmic Gymnastics World Championships
Gymnasts from Minsk
21st-century Belarusian women